Korugan (also Romanized as Korūgān; also known as Korūkān) is a village in Rezvan Rural District, Jebalbarez District, Jiroft County, Kerman Province, Iran. At the 2006 census, its population was 15, in 4 families.

References 

Populated places in Jiroft County